The Enel Agighiol Wind Farm is wind farm located in Tulcea County, Romania. It has 17 individual wind turbines with a nominal output of around 2 MW each and delivers up to 34 MW of power, enough to power over 35,000 homes, which required  a capital investment of approximately US$50 million.

References

Wind farms in Romania